Ribeira, Santa Mariña de (Also Sta. Marina de Ribeira in Spanish Castillian) is one of the 51 boroughs  which constitute the, predominantly very rural, municipality of A Estrada, Pontevedra, Galicia North Western Spain.

Altitude: 74m

Notes 

Municipalities in the Province of Pontevedra